Sir Frederick Banting Secondary School is a high school located in London, Ontario, Canada. It is part of the Thames Valley District School Board.  The school is named after Sir Frederick Banting, who won the Nobel Prize for the discovery of insulin in 1923. The school was officially opened in 1969 with Lady Banting, widow of Sir Frederick Banting, in attendance. The founding principal (1968–1970) was George A. Robbins.   Banting is recognized for having a strong French Immersion program and a music program.

Currently 1,600 students from grade 9–12 are enrolled.

Irene Mathyssen, the former Member of Parliament for London-Fanshawe, taught English at the school until she was elected in the 2006 federal election.

Banting shares an almost exact floor plan with its sister school, Montcalm Secondary School.

The school participated in CBC's series The Greatest Canadian, in which Sir Frederick Banting was nominated.

Athletics

Sir Frederick Banting Secondary School has produced the Canadian olympic athletes Jason Tunks, three-time Summer olympian discus-thrower; heptathlete Jessica Zelinka; speed skater Christine Nesbitt, gold-medalist at the 2010 Winter Olympics in women's 1000 m and silver-medalist at the 2006 Winter Olympics in the women's team pursuit; Melanie McCann, 2012 and 2016 Olympic competitor in the modern pentathlon; and Maggie MacNeil, a swimmer who won a gold medal at the 2020 Summer Olympics.  CFLers  Jude St. John, a Grey Cup-winning player with Toronto Argonauts and Hamilton Tiger Cat’s; Sean McKeon, OL for the Calgary Stampeders; Matt McKnight, DB for the Calgary Stampeders, and most recently 2019 Grey Cup winning Nick Hallett, DB with the Winnipeg Blue Bombers also attended Sir Frederick Banting Secondary School. NHL players Mike Van Ryn, Steve Rucchin, and Steve Stoyanovich were students at Banting SS. Alan Coulter played 13 years on the Canadian National Men's Volleyball Team and was captain part of those years. UFC MMA star Sam “Hands of Stone” Stout attended Banting before heading to the octagon for his successful fighting career.

Community services

Banting has hosted events for United Way programs, the annual S.C.R.O.O.G.E. campaign, D.A.R.E. (Delegates Attaining Raw Experience), a two-day retreat at a camp, and Wildcard, an event that started in 1998 which allows grade eight students to see what life at Banting is like with two full days of events and a sleepover. The school also has a neighbouring adult ESL centre.

See also
List of high schools in Ontario

Notable alumni
Maggie Mac Neil, Olympic Gold medallist, 2020 Summer Olympics

References

External links
Sir Frederick Banting Secondary School

High schools in London, Ontario
Educational institutions established in 1969
1969 establishments in Ontario